Cashville Takeover is a mixtape by rapper's Young Buck, C-Bo, The Outlawz & $o$a Da Plug, Hosted by DJ Rip. This was the first mixtape released with all the Ca$hville roster on one disc together. The mixtape features exclusive tracks and freestyles from Ca$hville Records with appearances by Snoop Dogg, All Star Cashville Prince, Yo Gotti, and more. It was released for digital download and sale on iTunes on February 3, 2009.

Track listing

References

2009 mixtape albums